The Accountancy functional constituency is a functional constituency seat in the Legislative Council of Hong Kong first created for the 1988 Legislative Council election, derived from the Financial functional constituency. In 2020, the constituency was composed of some 25,000 certified public accountants (CPAs) as compared to 222,000 citizens on average for the geographical constituencies.

It is one of the swing seats between the pro-Beijing and pro-democracy camps. It had the largest field of candidates in the 2004 Legislative Council election among the functional constituencies with nine candidates running in the constituency. Independent democrat Mandy Tam defeated pro-Beijing independent Paul Chan, but the result was reversed in 2008 when Mandy Tam lost her re-election to Paul Chan. Chan was resigned before the 2012 Legislative Council election to be appointed Secretary for Development by Chief Executive Leung Chun-ying. From 2012, the seat was held by Kenneth Leung of the Professional Commons (PC) until his disqualification from the office by the National People's Congress Standing Committee (NPCSC) in November 2021.

Return members

Electoral results

2020s

2010s

2000s

1990s

1980s

References

Constituencies of Hong Kong
Constituencies of Hong Kong Legislative Council
Functional constituencies (Hong Kong)
1988 establishments in Hong Kong
Constituencies established in 1988